Botolv Bråtalien (28 February 1892  –  6 November 1969) was a Norwegian politician for the Centre Party.

He was born in Ål.

He was elected to the Norwegian Parliament from Buskerud in 1958, and was re-elected on one occasion. He had previously served as a deputy representative in the period 1954–1957.

Bråtalien was involved in local politics in Ål municipality between 1928–1940 and 1951-1959.

References

1892 births
1969 deaths
Centre Party (Norway) politicians
Members of the Storting
20th-century Norwegian politicians
People from Ål